Katherine South is a suburb in the town of Katherine, Northern Territory, Australia. It is within the Katherine Town Council local government area. The area was officially defined as a suburb in April 2007, adopting the commonly used local name for the residential areas south of the Stuart Highway along the Katherine River.

References

Suburbs of Katherine, Northern Territory